LaForrest Rock is a rock outcrop  west of the mouth of Strom Glacier, along the low, ice-covered north slopes of the Duncan Mountains, Antarctica. This area was first explored and mapped by the Byrd Antarctic Expedition, 1928–30. The rock was named by the Advisory Committee on Antarctic Names for B.A. LaForrest, a storekeeper on U.S. Navy Operation Deep Freeze, 1966.

References

Rock formations of the Ross Dependency
Amundsen Coast